Tatenhill is a civil parish in the district of East Staffordshire, Staffordshire, England.  It contains 29 buildings that are recorded in the National Heritage List for England.  Of these, three are listed at Grade II*, the middle grade, and the others are at Grade II, the lowest grade.  The parish contains the villages of Tatenhill and Rangemore, and is otherwise rural.  The listed buildings include a country house and associated structures, houses and associated buildings, cottages, farmhouses and farm buildings, two churches and associated structures, a public house, two mileposts, and a school.

Key

Buildings

References

Citations

Sources

Lists of listed buildings in Staffordshire